Kankasundari is a rural municipality located in Jumla District of Karnali Province of Nepal.

References

External links
UN map of the municipalities of Jumla District
 

Populated places in Jumla District
Rural municipalities in Karnali Province
Rural municipalities of Nepal established in 2017